Şemsettin Baş (born January 4, 1973, in Istanbul, Turkey) is a retired Turkish professional basketball player and lastly was head coach of CSO Voluntari. At 6 ft 5.75 in (1.97 m), he played as a shooting guard and small forward.

He is of Bosniak origin and cousin of former NBA and Euroleague player Mirsad Türkcan.

External links
TBLStat.net Profile
TurkSports.Net Profile

1973 births
Living people
Galatasaray S.K. (men's basketball) players
Karşıyaka basketball players
Shooting guards
Small forwards
Basketball players from Istanbul
Tofaş S.K. players
Turkish men's basketball players
Türk Telekom B.K. players